Huaraz District is one of twelve districts of the province Huaraz in Peru.

Geography 
The Cordillera Blanca and the Cordillera Negra traverse the district. Some of the highest mountains of the district are listed below:

References

See also 
 Administrative divisions of Peru

Districts of the Huaraz Province
Districts of the Ancash Region